Jeladze is a Georgian surname. Notable people with the surname include:

 Gizo Jeladze (born 1975), Georgian footballer
 Zviad Jeladze (born 1973), Georgian footballer

Surnames of Georgian origin
Georgian-language surnames
Surnames of Abkhazian origin